Liverpool Chads are a defunct motorcycle speedway team who were based at the Stanley Stadium in Prescot Road, Fairfield, Liverpool, England.

History
Liverpool Speedway's team was established the late 1920s. League racing first took place in 1929 with the formation of the English Dirt Track League, effectively a Northern League, which ran alongside the Southern League.  In 1930 the team competed in the Northern League. They were known during this time as Liverpool Merseysiders. The Liverpool promotion were attached to the Belle Vue Aces promotion during this time but midway through 1937 the club folded and the riders moved to Belle Vue.

When the sport was revived in 1949 the team were known as Liverpool Chads. The team's nickname referred to a popular piece of cartoon graffiti at the time known as a Chad. They opened again in  the National League Division Three and were again based at Stanley Stadium, Liverpool. The team moved up to National League Division Two for the 1951 season and operated there until 1953 when the track closed, again in mid season. A new side now called Liverpool Eagles were created in 1957 but closed after a few meetings. A few open meetings were staged in 1959 and the club, now racing as the Liverpool Pirates, competed in the 1960 Provincial League. The club again closed at the end of the year and the Stanley Stadium was demolished and a fruit market was constructed on the site.

Speedway was also staged in Liverpool in the 1930s at Seaforth Greyhound Stadium.

Notable riders 
Peter Craven (World Champion)
Oliver Hart
Ginger Lees (rode in the first ever Speedway World Championship final in 1936)

Season summary

References 

Defunct British speedway teams
Sport in Liverpool